The Schleicher ASW 15 is a single-seat sailplane designed in 1968 by Gerhard Waibel and manufactured by Alexander Schleicher GmbH & Co. The ASW 15 has shoulder-mounted wings and an all-flying tailplane, with its single tow-release placement a compromise between winching and aerotowing. The later ASW 15B had several improvements, including a tow-release placed on the plane of symmetry, an 11 cm taller rudder, a slightly larger main wheel, and the provision of a 90-litre water ballast system.

Rot due to fungus infestation was found in an early example, leading to an Airworthiness Directive. Starting with serial number 356, balsa wood was abandoned in the construction in favour of synthetic foam.

It was succeeded by the Schleicher ASW 19.

Variants
ASW 15Original production version incorporating balsa / fibre-glass sandwich wing construction. Built to pre 1970 Standard class rules the ASW 15 had non-retracting recessed mainwheel and no provision for water ballast; 183 built.
ASW 15BSecond production version with glass-fibre / foam construction, retractable mainwheel and  water ballast tanks; 270 built.
ASW 15MOne ASW 15 converted to a motor-glider powered by a   Wankel KM-27 rotary engine, with a  fuel tank at an empty equipped weight of

Aircraft on display
US Southwest Soaring Museum

Specifications (ASW 15B)

See also

References

Further reading

External links

Sailplane Directory
ASW-15(B) owners and users website
Alexander Schleicher website

1960s German sailplanes
Schleicher aircraft
Aircraft first flown in 1968
Shoulder-wing aircraft